The Civil Party of Costa Rica was a political grouping that arose in 1893 in sight of the 1894 Costa Rican general election. Initially it acted without a candidate, but later it postulated Navy Secretary of War Rafael Yglesias Castro, who won the electoral vote in the second level election. Subsequently, the party participated in the mid-term election of 1896 for the renewal of half of the Congress, and postulated the re-election of Rafael Yglesias Castro for the 1898 election, in which the opposition refrained from participating. In the 1902 presidential elections it did not nominates any candidate and endorses Ascensión Esquivel Ibarra.

The Civil Party had an eminently personal character, around the figure of Rafael Yglesias Castro, with some liberal and populist ideas, but without actually having a clearly defined ideological line. It returned to the political scene in the presidential elections of 1910 and 1913, to nominate Yglesias Castro, but the results of the elections were adverse. Neither managed to elect him as a deputy in the legislative elections of 1915, with which the party virtually disappeared from the Costa Rican political scene.

References

Defunct political parties in Costa Rica
Defunct liberal political parties